Eliza Krul (born 1981, in Delft), known professionally as Liz Kay, is a Dutch Eurodance-singer and social media marketeer.

Biography
At age 16, Kay began her career as a professional singer. She performed and became part of a small talent show.

In recent years, Kay has worked with various DJ's in recording studios, including Yanou

Kay commented: "We did a song to see if we are a good team. I was very excited, because I know that Yanou is a major producer. It felt so natural and we were very happy with the results, so we never stopped working together. Manian is also an important part of the team. I am very proud and grateful to work with both of them!"

In 2007, the eurodance-single "When Love Becomes a Lie" was released, followed by "Castles in the Sky", which was originally released by Ian Van Dahl. 

Kay founded a band during 2011, "Liz & The Doctors" and entertains at weddings and other occasions.

Discography 
Singles
2006: "King of My Castle" (with Yanou))
2007: "When Love Becomes a Lie"
2007: "You're Not Alone" (Olive cover)
2007: "Castles in the Sky" (Ian Van Dahl cover)
2008: "True Faith"
2008: "To France 2008" (Mike Oldfield & Maggie Reilly cover)
2009: "You're Not Alone 2009" (re-release from the 2007 single "You're Not Alone")
2010: "To the Moon and Back"
Collaborations
2010: Something About You (with R.I.O.)
2010: Watching You (with R.I.O.)

External links

References 

1981 births
Living people
People from Delft
20th-century Dutch women singers
21st-century Dutch women singers
21st-century Dutch singers